The Six Days of Paris was a six-day track cycling race held annually in Paris, France.

Winners

References

Cycle races in France
Six-day races
Recurring sporting events established in 1913
1913 establishments in France
1981 disestablishments in France
Defunct cycling races in France
Cycling in Paris